"Shazam!" is a song written by Duane Eddy and Lee Hazlewood and performed by Eddy.  It reached No. 4 on the UK Singles Chart and No. 45 on the Billboard Hot 100 in 1960.

Other versions
The Shadows released a version of the song in 1963 as the B-side to their single "Geronimo".

References

1960 songs
1960 singles
1963 singles
Songs written by Duane Eddy
Songs written by Lee Hazlewood
Duane Eddy songs
The Shadows songs
Columbia Records singles
Jamie Records singles